The 2002–03 Mestis season was the third season of the Mestis, the second level of ice hockey in Finland. 12 teams participated in the league, and Jukurit won the championship.

Standings

Playoffs

Qualification

UJK was relegated to Suomi-sarja.

External links
 Season on hockeyarchives.info

Fin
2002–03 in Finnish ice hockey
Mestis seasons